LaRue (sometimes seen or written as Larue) is an unincorporated community located in Henderson County, Texas, United States. At the time of the 2000 census the population was estimated at 160.

Overview
The La Poynor Independent School District serves area students.

LaRue was the host of the 2011 Barefoot Economic Summit.

Personalities
Carl Reynolds (1903-1978), baseball player

References

Unincorporated communities in Henderson County, Texas
Unincorporated communities in Texas